Amedeo Kleva (6 February 1923 – 22 June 1996) was a Bulgarian-born Italian footballer who played as a defender. He spent his career in Bulgaria and earned two caps for the Bulgarian national team. At club level, Kleva won three A Group titles and two Bulgarian Cups with Levski Sofia.

Honours

Club
Levski Sofia
 A Group (3): 1948–49, 1950, 1953
 Bulgarian Cup (2): 1949, 1950

References

External links
Player Profile at LevskiSofia.info

1923 births
1996 deaths
Italian footballers
Bulgaria international footballers
Bulgarian footballers
First Professional Football League (Bulgaria) players
PFC Levski Sofia players
Place of birth missing
Association football defenders